The 1910 Norwegian Football Cup was the ninth season of the Norwegian annual knockout football tournament. The tournament was open for 1910 local association leagues (kretsserier) champions, and the defending champion, Lyn. Lyn won their third consecutive title, having beaten Odd in all three finals.

First round

|colspan="3" style="background-color:#97DEFF"|3 September 1910

|-
|colspan="3" style="background-color:#97DEFF"|4 September 1910

|}

Semi-finals

|colspan="3" style="background-color:#97DEFF"|18 September 1910

|}

Final

References

External links
RSSSF Football Archive

Norwegian Football Cup seasons
Norway
Football Cup